SportsCentury is an ESPN biography television program that reviews the people and events that defined sports in North America throughout the 20th and 21st centuries. Using stock footage, on-camera interviews, and photographs of their athletic lives, who grew up.

In 1999, ESPN counted down the Top 50 Athletes of the 20th Century, selected from North American athletes and voted on by a panel of sports journalists and observers, premiering a new biography highlighting each top athlete every week throughout the year. The episodes for the top two athletes, Michael Jordan and Babe Ruth, appeared on a special combined edition broadcast on Christmas Day on ABC. The top two names were announced in no particular order, and the final positioning was announced at the conclusion of the two episodes. An additional list of numbers 51–100 were announced on the ESPN SportsCentury website. Themed specials such as Greatest Games, Greatest Coaches, Greatest Dynasties, and Most Influential Individuals were premiered throughout the year, as well as six SportsCenter of the Decade programs.

After the initial run was complete, the episodes were rerun at various times on ESPN, ESPN2 and ESPN Classic. The original plan for the series was to expand to include #51 through #100. Ultimately, the series featured just over half of the athletes from #51 to #100, and instead expanded to include over 150 other athletes, coaches, owners, personalities, and notable moments in sports history. Acknowledgements were given to athletes that were notable for more recent accomplishments, even if they spent only a small part of their career in the 20th century (e.g., Tiger Woods, Tom Brady), or were recently deceased (e.g. Pat Tillman, Dale Earnhardt). Special subsets of episodes were created revolving around a particular event, including athletes associated with the particular sport. They would typically air in the days leading up to those events. (e.g., Winter Olympics, golf majors, Indianapolis 500, etc.)

ESPN Classic began to feature the program with host, Chris Fowler, as the highlight of its weeknight prime-time programing, airing five nights a week. After cycling through the entire series several times, and after debuting several new episodes, it was removed as a nightly program.  , reruns of the documentary series airs Monday through Friday at 4 p.m. Eastern time.  The last original program was that of Shaquille O'Neal, which aired in November 2007.

Controversy 
The final order of choices led to debate, some of which came from the SportsCentury camp.  Bob Costas, one of the series' voters, said, "I had Babe Ruth as my number one, but I think the list they came up with was a good one. Everybody more or less deserved to be there."  ESPN writer Bud Morgan conceded that the Secretariat pick "was kind of controversial because a lot of people took the attitude 'What is a four-legged animal doing on this list?'"

Tony Kornheiser, whose ballot was topped by Ruth, Muhammad Ali and Michael Jordan, said, "I can't conceive of how Ruth didn't finish number one.  He had the greatest impact of anybody on a sport by far... Michael Jordan didn't have as many championships as Bill Russell and didn't score as many points as Wilt Chamberlain, and really didn't do anything to advance his sport, so maybe in retrospect I upgraded him a bit too much because the way he performed was so spectacular, and because of television I got to see highlights.  They may have overpersuaded a lot of us... Did Jim Thorpe get the praise he deserved?  Probably not, because there weren't enough people old enough to really remember him."

ESPN anchor Charley Steiner said "I think picking [Jordan] number one was a generational decision, not a historical one.  Babe Ruth deserved it more."

Don King lawsuit
In 2005, Don King and his promotional company, Don King Productions, Inc. filed a $2.5 billion defamation suit against the Walt Disney Company, the current owners of ESPN and ABC Cable Networks Group, and Advocate Communications, after a documentary alleged that King had "killed, not once, but twice", threatened to break Larry Holmes' legs, had a hospital invest into a film that was never made, cheated Meldrick Taylor out of $1 million, and then threatened to have Taylor killed. Though the documentary repeated many claims that were already made, King said he had now had enough. King's attorney said "It was slanted to show Don in the worst way. It was one-sided from day one, Don is a strong man, but he has been hurt by this."

The case was dismissed on summary judgment with a finding that King could not show "actual malice" from the defendants, and that King had failed to prove that any of the challenged statements were false. The judgement also pointed out that the studio had tried on a number of occasions to interview King for the documentary, but he had declined; while not suggesting that King had a legal obligation to do so, the court sympathized with ESPN's circumstances on those grounds. King appealed the decision and, 3 years later, the Second District Court of Appeals upheld the summary judgement, but disagreed with the original finding that none of the statements were false. In any case, Judge Dorian Damoorgian ruled, "Nothing in the record shows that ESPN purposefully made false statements about King in order to bolster the theme of the program or to inflict harm on King".

Recognition 
SportsCentury won a Peabody Award in 1999 "for overall excellence in sports broadcasting."

SportsCentury: Top 50 American Athletes of the 20th Century (Original series)

SportsCentury: 51–100

Athlete statistics

 By sport 
Baseball: 22
Football: 20
Track/Field: 12
Basketball: 11
Tennis: 8
Boxing: 7
Hockey: 6
Golf: 6
Horse racing: 5 (2 jockeys, 3 horses)
Auto racing: 3
Swimming / Diving: 2
Speed skating: 2
Gymnastics: 1

 By gender
89 male
8 female
3 thoroughbred horses

Additional SportsCentury episodes

Athletes

Affirmed & Alydar
Andre Agassi
Lyle Alzado
Lance Armstrong
Arthur Ashe
Charles Barkley
Chuck Bednarik
Albert Belle
Johnny Bench
Yogi Berra
Moe Berg
Barry Bonds
Terry Bradshaw
Tom Brady
Kobe Bryant
Roy Campanella
Jennifer Capriati
Steve Carlton
Hurricane Carter
Rubin Carter
Roger Clemens
Cynthia Cooper
Jim Craig
John Daly
Ernie Davis
Oscar De La Hoya
Dale Earnhardt
Dale Earnhardt Jr.
Dennis Eckersley
John Elway
Brett Favre
Bob Feller
Mark Fidrych
Charlie Finley
Carlton Fisk
Peggy Fleming
Tim Flock
Curt Flood
Richmond Flowers
Doug Flutie
Cheryl Ford
George Foreman
Bevo Francis
Joe Frazier
Dan Gable
Kevin Garnett
Zina Garrison
Mark Gastineau
Frank Gifford
Jeff Gordon
Steffi Graf
Red Grange
Rocky Graziano
Hank Greenberg
Florence Griffith Joyner
Marvin Hagler
Dorothy Hamill
Mia Hamm
Connie Hawkins
Evander Holyfield
Paul Hornung
Sam Huff
Allen Iverson
Reggie Jackson
Dan Jansen
Bruce Jenner
Derek Jeter
Nile Kinnick
Anna Kournikova
Michelle Kwan
Don Larsen
Sugar Ray Leonard
Ray Lewis
Eric Lindros
Sonny Liston
Nancy Lopez
Jerry Lucas
Karl Malone
Peyton Manning
Pete Maravich
Roger Maris
Billy Martin (2-part)
Pedro Martínez
Gene Mauch
Bill Mazeroski
John McEnroe
Mark McGwire
Denny McLain
Jim McMahon
Rick Mears
Phil Mickelson
Archie Moore
Randy Moss
Alonzo Mourning
Greg Norman
Shaquille O'Neal
Terrell Owens
Pelé
Brian Piccolo
Jimmy Piersall
Jacques Plante
Gary Player
Jim Plunkett
Cal Ripken Jr.
Frank Robinson
Andy Roddick
Dennis Rodman
Seabiscuit
Curt Schilling
Willie Shoemaker
Emmitt Smith
Seattle Slew
Sammy Sosa
Latrell Sprewell
Bart Starr
Casey Stengel
Tony Stewart
Darryl Strawberry
Maurice Stokes
Picabo Street
Isiah Thomas
Pat Tillman
Lee Trevino
Mike Tyson
Al Unser, Sr.
Bill Vukovich
Bill Walton
Bud Wilkinson
Chris Webber
Reggie White
Jayson Williams
Venus & Serena Williams
Tyrone Willingham
Tiger Woods
Carl Yastrzemski
Sources

Coaches, owners, and other personalities

Sparky Anderson
Red Auerbach
Bobby Bowden
Larry Brown
Bear Bryant
Al Davis
Woody Hayes
Phil Jackson
Willie Jeffries
Don King
Bob Knight
Mike Krzyzewski
Tom Landry
Vince Lombardi
Bill Parcells
Rick Pitino
Pete Rozelle
Adolph Rupp
Don Shula
Dean Smith
George Steinbrenner
Bill Veeck
Dick Vermeil
John Wooden

Games, teams, and other special episodes
1972 Olympic Men's Basketball Final
1977 British Open
Game 5 of the 1997 NBA Finals ("The Flu Game")
Ball Four
Epic in Miami (Chargers vs. Dolphins)
New York Yankees
Jerry's Cowboys
Bears 46 defense
Villanova vs. Georgetown (1985 NCAA Championship)
Disciples of Jackie Robinson
1999 Ryder Cup

Special episodes

SportsCentury: Greatest Games of the 20th Century
"Greatest Games" was a top ten countdown of the best games/matches voted on from a wide variety of team and individual sports.
 "The Greatest Game Ever Played" – (1958 NFL Championship): Baltimore Colts vs. New York Giants (1958)
 The Shot Heard 'Round the World – Bobby Thomson's home run (1951)
 Super Bowl III – New York Jets defeat Baltimore Colts (1969)
 Miracle on Ice – U.S.A defeats U.S.S.R. (1980)
 "Thrilla in Manila" – Muhammad Ali vs. Joe Frazier (1975)
 "Ice Bowl" – Green Bay vs. Dallas (1967)
 Game 6 of the 1975 World Series – Carlton Fisk's home run (1975)
 Tiger Woods wins the Masters (1997)
 Willis Reed and Knicks beat Lakers in Game 7 (1970)
 Borg-McEnroe Wimbledon thriller (1980)

SportsCentury: Greatest Coaches of the 20th Century
"Greatest Coaches" was a top ten countdown of the best coaches voted on from a wide variety of team sports
 Vince Lombardi
 John Wooden
 Red Auerbach
 Dean Smith
 Bear Bryant
 John McGraw
 George Halas
 Don Shula
 Paul Brown
 Knute Rockne

SportsCentury: Greatest Dynasties
New York Yankees
Boston Celtics
Montreal Canadiens
John Wooden's UCLA Bruins (1960s and 1970s)
Notre Dame Fighting Irish football team (1946–1949)
Dallas Cowboys (1990s)
Atlanta Braves (1990s)
Chicago Bulls (1990s)
San Francisco 49ers (1980s)

SportsCentury: Most Influential Individuals
Another top ten countdown special, focusing on influential figures in sports during the twentieth century, namely off-the-field contributors.

 Branch Rickey
 Pete Rozelle
 Roone Arledge
 Marvin Miller
 Kenesaw Mountain Landis
 David Stern
 Avery Brundage
 Walter O'Malley
 George Halas
 Mark McCormack

SportsCentury: The Year in Review

1980 Year in Review
1981 Year in Review
1982 Year in Review
1983 Year in Review
1984 Year in Review
1985 Year in Review
1986 Year in Review
1987 Year in Review
1988 Year in Review
1989 Year in Review
1990 Year in Review
1991 Year in Review
1992 Year in Review
1993 Year in Review
1994 Year in Review
1995 Year in Review
1996 Year in Review
1997 Year in Review
1998 Year in Review
1999 Year in Review
2000 Year in Review
2001 Year in Review

Also included in the overall production was "SportsCenter of the Decade", a series of six two-hour programs (1900–1949, 1950s, 1960s, 1970s, 1980s and 1990s). Each episode was presented as a fictional episode of SportsCenter, in the way ESPN would have covered the events at the time (styles, studio/production design, and other various pop culture references).

Notes

Citations

References
ESPN SportsCentury – Official Site
 

ESPN Classic original programming
American sports television series
1990s American documentary television series
2000s American documentary television series
1999 American television series debuts
2006 American television series endings
English-language television shows
Peabody Award-winning television programs
Documentary television series about sports